Yaar Jigree Kasooti Degree is an Indian Punjabi-language comedy-drama web-series created by Rabby Tiwana. Co-produced by Troll Punjabi and Media International, the series is based on life of college students. The series marks as one of first Punjabi successful web-series. The first episode of the series was aired on 15 September 2018, with first season concluding on 31 December 2018 at  have been viewed over thirty and fifteen million times respectively. Season 2 premiered on 30 September 2020 and concluded on 30 December 2020.

Cast

Main 

 Pukhraj Bhalla as Jaspreet Singh Randhawa 'Jass'
 Karan Sandhawalia as Lakhvinder Singh 'Lucky'
 Sukhdeep Sapra as Anmoldeep Singh Sidhu 'Anmol'
 Amrit Amby as Gurshabd Singh Brar'Lali'
 Prateek Singh Rai as Ekamveer Singh Gill 'Ekam'
 Karanvir Deol as Rupinder Singh Oberoi 'Roop'
 Jasmin Bajwa as Daizy Garewal
 Pawan Johal as Kirat
 Prateek Vadheera as Bhushan
 Tannu Kaur as Japneet
 Debobrato Mukherjee as Harman

Recurring 

 Nirbhai Dhaliwal as Balveer Sir
 Enaayat Jugnu Surjeet as 'Faujji'
 Charanpreet Maan as Jessica
 Hashneen Chauhan as Simran
 Jagmeet Kaur as Sukhmani
 Gurjeet Singh Channi as Yuvraj Garewal
 Gaurav Sharma as Guru
 Chamkour Billa as Teji
 Babar Bassi as Lakha
 Davy Garewal as Vijayraj Singh Chima
 Lakha Khorupanti as Navdeep Singh
 Deepak Kamboj as Gajendra Rathi(HYM President)
 Sukhi Patran as Ustaad
 Satnam Dhuri (Teji's Friend)
 Dilveer Dill (Teji's Friend)
 Deepak kamboj
 Raj Dhaliwal
 Khushi Arora

Special Appearance 

 Sharry Mann as Himself
 N Gritz as Himself
 Alaap Sikandar as Himself

Episodes

Season 1 (2018)

Season 2 (2020)

Production 

Rabby Tiwana whilst studying B.Tech in TV production and media technology at Centre For Advanced Media Studies, Punjabi University developed the series.
Most of the cast in the web-series are also the students of Punjabi University including Pukhraj Bhalla and Karan Sandhawalia. The principal photography of the series began in April 2017.

Due to his previous successful documentary he went to produce the web-series by himself only under his production company Troll Punjabi. Tiwana said, “After my documentary won various awards, my parents got convinced that I was on the right track, so they helped me with the project.” “It was meant to be for television, but no channel took it up; some found the quality poor, some had other issues, so, I finally gave the satellite rights to Troll Punjabi (a web page started by him) and kept the web rights with myself,” adds the director. Jung Bahadur Singh, teacher, said, “This is an all-student production; they haven’t hired a single professional.”

Soundtrack 

Soundtrack of the web-series is composed by Mista Baaz, Sarang Sikander, Preet Hundal, Sharan Shergill, Kru172, Dreamboy and JT Bhatti which features vocals from Sharry Mann, Sardool Sikander, Sarang Sikander, Preet Hundal, Daman Kaushal, Pukhraj Bhalla, Karan Sandhawalia, Rabia Sagoo and Harinder Samra. All the tracks were released by Troll Punjabi themselves only. The theme and promotional track of series sung by Mann went viral, and has been viewed over 70 million times on YouTube.

Track list 

 Season 1 

 Season 2

Release

Season 1 

The first look of the series was released on 23 March 2018 by Troll Punjabi on YouTube and the teaser was released on 5 August 2018. The theme song of the series sung by Sharry Mann and penned by Karan Sandhawalia was released on 22 August 2018 often the song was leaked on internet before. Official trailer was released on 1 September 2018 and the first episode was released on 15 September 2018 followed by other episodes releasing every Saturday while few were postponed due to various reasons. the series remarks the struggle of college students in india; rustication, drugs, marks and much much more. The series is also the first Punjabi web-series followed by Gangland in Motherland.

Season 2 

The trailer of Season 2 was released on 27 September 2020 and first Episode released on 30 September 2020 in Troll Punjabi YouTube Channel, followed by other episodes of Season 2 will be release every Saturday. Their can be a few exceptions in the release date as the farmer protest and some social, and financial issues from the crew.

Season 3 

The team of the show told the viewers that Season 3 will come when Troll Punjabi youtube channel will hit 10 million subscribers.

Reception 

The web-series received positive responses from its audience but was criticized a lot for its release delays.

References

External links 

 
Yaar Jigree Kasooti Degree on YouTube
Yaar Jigree Kasooti Degree Season 2 and 3 Episodes
Yaar Jigree Kasooti Degree Season 2 Episodes

Indian comedy web series